René Feye (7 August 1881 – 29 November 1936) was a Belgian footballer. He played in five matches for the Belgium national football team from 1906 to 1907.

References

External links
 

1881 births
1936 deaths
Belgian footballers
Belgium international footballers
Place of birth missing
Association football midfielders
R.W.D. Molenbeek players
Léopold FC players